Andrey Igorevich Melnichenko (born 8 March 1972) is a Russian billionaire entrepreneur. He is the founder and ex-beneficiary of fertilizer producer EuroChem Group and coal producer SUEK, and was a non-executive director in both companies until 9 March 2022.

Forbes and Bloomberg estimated his net worth at $15.8 billion and $17.4 billion respectively, which makes him one of the richest persons in Russia. After the Soviet Union fell, he began trading currency with two friends while a physics student at Moscow State University, and then registered a bank, MDM Bank.

Melnichenko took an interest in the commodities market and began buying assets in coal and fertilizers, with the acquisition of plants and mines, many of which were distressed. He founded fertilizer producer Eurochem and coal energy company SUEK.

Early life and education
Melnichenko was born on 8 March 1972 in Gomel, Byelorussian SSR. His parents, a Belarusian father and Ukrainian mother, were teachers. He attended the Advanced Education and Science Centre of the Lomonosov Moscow State University, and in 1989, became a student of the Faculty of Physics at Moscow State University. He then transferred to the Plekhanov Russian University of Economics, from which he graduated in finance.

Career history

Banking and investments 
While at university, Melnichenko began his entrepreneurial ventures by opening a currency exchange booth on the campus. Having made their first US$50,000 through a chain of the currency exchange booths, Melnichenko and his partners, two like-minded fellow students, received a banking license from the Bank of Russia. In 1993, at the age of 21, Melnichenko co-founded the MDM Bank. The bank moved on buying currency at the interbank foreign exchange, developing a derivatives market and debt instruments. From 1993 to 1997, Melnichenko chaired the Board of Directors of MDM Bank. From the late 1990s to the early 2000s, MDM Bank expanded through acquisition, integrating seven regional banks. MDM Bank did not participate in any post-Soviet privatization programs or the loans-for-shares auctions of the 1990s. In 1997, Melnichenko bought out MDM Bank shares from his partners and became the sole shareholder of the Bank and the Chairman of the management board. Bloomberg reported that "unlike many bigger rivals, MDM came through the 1998 Russian financial crisis nearly unscathed, thanks to a conservative credit policy, the lack of illiquid assets and no exposure to government bonds. As competitors went under, the lender snagged some of the biggest Russian companies as clients." From 2001 to 2005, he chaired MDM Bank's board of directors. MDM Bank was named the "Bank of the Year" by The Banker in 2002 and 2003. In 2003, Euromoney and, in 2004, Global Finance, named it the "Best Russian Bank".

In 2000, Melnichenko, together with Sergei Popov, a former metals trader from Ural, co-founded the MDM Group for industrial investments into three areas: pipeline manufacturing, coal production and processing, production and processing of fertilizers. It was done through the acquisition of more than 50 independently run and owned businesses: joint-stock companies, plants and mines, which enabled to form three separate companies: SUEK, EuroChem and TMK (which he exited in 2006 through an IPO at the London Stock Exchange). These industries were derelict and risky and not subject to the political influence that dominated other sectors. With the process of post-Soviet era privatizations having finished five years earlier, no more than 5% of the assets purchased were acquired from the state. From 2001 to 2004, Melnichenko was the President of the MDM Group.

From 2004 to 2007, Melnichenko sold shares of MDM Bank to his MDM Group partner Sergei Popov, and focused on the development of the industrial assets in fertilizers and coal. Following Melnichenko's decision to step down from MDM Bank in 2007, the International Financial Corporation (IFC) purchased 5% of MDM Bank shares for US$185 million, valuing the bank at US$3.7 billion. Having served its consolidating purpose, MDM Group ceased to exist.

EuroChem 
In 2007, he became EuroChem's majority shareholder. Earlier, Melnichenko became the chairman of the mineral and chemical company OJSC EuroChem in April 2004. When EuroChem was founded, the purchased assets included several nitrogen plants and a phosphate mine with Soviet-era equipment.

New manufacturing facilities were built in Novomoskovsk, Nevinnomyssk, and Kovdor (including an apatite and shtaffelite ores processing complex). EuroChem acquired laboratories in Germany in 2011, which led to the creation of similar facilities in Russia and other countries, which are working on the development of second-generation fertilizers, including advanced slow-release products aimed at reducing the environmental footprint of the agricultural sector. EuroChem bought licenses for potash deposits in Volgograd (2005) and Perm (2008), launching plans to develop two large potash industrial plants. EuroChem's two potash mines are planning to produce 8 million metric tons of the fertilizer a year, a 10th of current world output. According to Bloomberg, "the acquisition of a BASF SE plant in Antwerp by EuroChem for 830 million euros ($930 million) brought in new technologies" for the company. BASF sold its fertilizers activities in Antwerp, Belgium, to EuroChem on March 31, 2012. In July 2012, EuroChem completed the acquisition of K+S Nitrogen, a company marketing nitrogenous fertilizers with a focus on major customers in agriculture and special crops such as fruits, vegetables and grapes.

In 2015, EuroChem moved its headquarters to Switzerland for access to the capital markets and international operations. It has manufacturing, logistic and distribution facilities in Russia, Belgium, Lithuania, Estonia, China, Germany, Kazakhstan, and the USA. EuroChem products are sold in more than 100 countries. EuroChem Group has raised funds on the international capital markets. In 2016, EuroChem invested in biological crop nutrition company Agrinos for research and development into a new generation of products. Elsewhere, EuroChem expanded its distribution network, buying operations in the US, Argentina, Brazil and Hungary.

In 2019, EuroChem launched US$1 billion ammonia plant, EuroChem Northwest, in Kingisepp, Russia, with a production capacity of 1 million tonnes (1MMT) per year, ensuring its full self-sufficiency in ammonia. The plant was built on a brownfield site and has a closed water recycling system to prevent water discharge into the Baltic Sea, using 75% of wastewater from its own Phosphorit phosphate plant nearby. The company is also reportedly building EuroChem Northwest 2, a new 1.1 MMT ammonia and 1.4 MMT urea plant, on an adjacent site in Kingisepp, Russia.  Melnichenko announced at SPIEF 2021 that "EuroChem was investing $4.4 billion into modern high-tech ammonia, urea and methanol plants" in Kingisepp in Russia's North-West, of which "10% were being invested into the innovative environmental technologies, which exceed Russia’s regulatory standards", referring to carbon capture and water recycling.

EuroChem reportedly was also eyeing an ammonia and urea plant in Louisiana. In 2020, EuroChem's Usolskiy Potash Project in Perm produced 2.223 MMT of potash.

EuroChem produces commodity and specialty fertilizers including inhibitor products that allow slow release of nutrients into crops.

Melnichenko publicly described his strategy on fertilizers as "taking advantage of the wide range of mineral resources found in Russia and the CIS, having a far-reaching distribution network, backed by logistics assets; and developing general and special purpose fertilisers simultaneously, in constant close contact with direct customers".

Melnichenko served as Non-Executive Director of EuroChem Group AG. Melnichenko was the effective beneficiary of 100 percent of EuroChem. On 9 March 2022, he resigned from all positions and withdrew as its beneficiary.

SUEK 
Melnichenko became a director of SUEK JSC (Siberian Coal Energy Company) in February 2005, and the chairman in June 2011. The same year, he created the Siberian Generating Company (SGC) on the basis of electricity assets of SUEK and became the chairman. In 2013, he became the primary shareholder of SUEK and SGC after he has bought his ex-partner's shares.

The assets that formed SUEK were distressed – production capacity was less than 30 million tons per year, the enterprises employed 70,000 miners yet productivity was low, and virtually none of its output was exported. The average equipment depreciation was 90%. During the early years of the business, SUEK's assets were modernized, debts were repaid, wages and taxes were paid, and a modernization program was launched with new machinery. The old mines and worn-out equipment were transformed into modern enterprises. Several enrichment factories and modules were put into operation allowing SUEK to produce highly enriched coal. SUEK built modern bulk terminals and upgraded seaports, and built a coal mine methane processing station to generate power within the framework of the Kyoto Protocol. According to the International Energy Agency's Clean Coal Centre, "SUEK, Russia's main exporter of higher-quality thermal coal, has invested in modern high-capacity washing plants and has ash control technologies at all its coal ports".

After the consolidation of electric power assets, Melnichenko created the Siberian Generating Company (SGC) as a part of SUEK, and then spun it out as a separate company. In 2018, SUEK took over SGC. SGC produces 25% of electricity in Siberia (6% of Russia's electricity).

According to Bloomberg, SUEK produces high-calorific coal with low sulphur and nitrogen content. It is a global supplier of high-calorific value coal with distribution in 48 countries worldwide, including the Asia Pacific where it supplies coal for HELE (high efficiency, low emission) power plants.

The Financial Times reported that SUEK uses automation and digitalization in coal mining. It reported that SUEK "is rolling out big-data tools and automation across its 26 mines in Kemerovo and elsewhere in Siberia. In some mining operations, it is even experimenting with completely replacing workers with machines" and "has piloted Russia’s first fully automated longwall in Polysaevo."

SUEK assets produce more than 100 million tons of coal annually, with assured coal reserves of 7.6 billion tons.  Its coal, power generation and logistics enterprises in 12 Russian regions employ over 70,000 people. According to S&P Global Ratings, "SUEK's mining segment outperforms peers on greenhouse gas (GHG) emissions", noting that "its governance structure compares positively to local standards and well with international standards. According to The Financial Times, SUEK pays its workers "more than four times the salary ordinary workers in neighbouring mines say they get." According to ESG Ranking of Russian companies 2021 by RAEX, SUEK ranks 11th out of 110 companies in Russia.

SUEK's subsidiary SGC produces more sustainable energy in Russia by co-generation of electricity and heat which reduces the coal combusted and the environmental impact by 25% for the same output. SGC operates modern combined heat and power plants (CHPP) which reduce fuel use and emissions per unit of energy produced, with 96% for heat and 38% for electricity produced in the combined cycle. Co-generation reportedly reduces 10 times more  emissions already today than from the use of all Russia's renewables currently planned (including wind and solar), while it is 5-10 times more cost-effective in cutting  emissions than are renewables (with 45% of electricity and 95% of heat in Siberia generated from coal).

Melnichenko publicly stated on fossil fuels that "given the current level of technology, it will only be possible for alternative energy sources to reduce carbon emissions in some regions", adding that "companies and governments will need to develop other solutions to expand alternatives energy and that’s unlikely to happen in the next few decades."

Melnichenko served as Non-Executive Director of SUEK JSC - since April 2015 to 2022. He was the main beneficiary of SUEK. As of 2021, he owned 92.2 percent stake in SUEK. On 9 March 2022, he resigned from all positions and withdrew as its beneficiary.

Business record 
According to media reports, in the last fifteen years, Melnichenko's companies invested more than $23 billion in Russia's new economy and industrial sector. His companies reportedly employ over 100,000 people. 20% of all investment by non-oil and gas companies made in Russia in 2012–2017 were made by Andrey Melnichenko's companies. Melnichenko's companies reportedly spent over $500 million on social and charitable projects.

Melnichenko's key assets included:

 EuroChem Group AG: a fertilizer producer. Melnichenko was the effective beneficiary of 100% of the company's shares until 9 March 2022.
 SUEK (Siberian Coal Energy Company) JSC:  a coal producer. Andrey Melnichenko was the beneficiary of 92.2% of the company's shares (Siberian Generating Company LLC (SGC) is directly owned by SUEK) until 9 March 2022.

Melnichenko was a Member of the Board of Directors (Non-executive Director) at both EuroChem Group AG and SUEK JSC until 9 March 2022.

Since 2007, Melnichenko has been Member of the Bureau of the Board of Directors of the Russian Union of Industrialists and Entrepreneurs (RSPP), where he is Chairman of the Mining Commission and Chairman of the Committee on Climate Policy and Carbon Regulation.

In the 2000s, Melnichenko was part of the EU-Russia Industrialists' Roundtable (IRT), a platform composed of business leaders from the EU and Russia, which work aimed at boosting EU-Russia economic relations.

In 2019, Andrey Melnichenko was awarded with the honour of Commendatore of the Order of the Star of Italy "for encouraging dialogue and economic cooperation between Italy and Russia".

Though Melnichenko was mentioned on the list of "Russian oligarchs" named in the CAATSA unclassified report to the U.S. Congress, the report simply listed all businessmen with an estimated net worth over $1 billion, according to the Forbes list 2017. The report states that inclusion on the list "does not constitute the determination by any agency that any of those individuals or entities meet the criteria for designation under any sanctions program" and "does not, in and of itself, imply, give rise to, or create any other restrictions, prohibitions, or limitations on dealings with such persons by either U.S. or foreign persons." Melnichenko noted that he had seen no issues with banks and compliance, but that the situation was impossible to predict going forward.

Among Russia's richest businessmen, Forbes and Forbes Russia do not consider Melnichenko to be an oligarch because his fortune was made without ties to the Russian government, neither under Yeltsin nor Putin.

According to Reuters, Melnichenko spoke out against the war in Ukraine and called for urgent peace, warning of a global food crisis and likely food shortages due to "soaring prices in fertilisers".

Sanctions 
Melnichenko was placed on the EU sanctions list on the 9 March 2022 on the basis of being "one of the leading businesspersons involved in economic sectors providing a substantial source of revenue to the Government of Russia". In response, Melnichenko commented that he had no relation to the invasion, nor did he have any political affiliations, noting that "to draw a parallel between attending a meeting through membership in a business council, just as dozens of businesspeople from both Russia and Europe have done in the past, and undermining or threatening a country is absurd and nonsensical" and that it was unjustified for him to be placed on the EU sanctions list. It was reported that Melnichenko stepped down from his positions at Eurochem and SUEK and withdrew as a beneficiary. According to Swedish economist Anders Aslund, the former senior fellow in the Eurasia Center at the Atlantic Council and the author of "Russia's Crony Capitalism", Melnichenko shouldn't have been sanctioned. Reuters reported that he will be disputing the sanctions listing.

In January 2023 Japan imposed sanctions on Andrey Melnichenko.

Philanthropy 
The Andrey Melnichenko Foundation supports talented children in science and education aiming at creating social mobility in Russia.

The Andrey Melnichenko Foundation launched a network of educational and scientific centres for gifted children across Russia and is to award scholarships for studying in higher education institutions to select students. In February 2018, the Foundation organized the "Internet Olympiad in Physics and Mathematics" for high school students in Russia. The winners were given the opportunity to study at the Sirius Centre for Gifted Education.

His companies have spent over $500 million on social and charitable programs, which have been recognized as leaders in Russia's annual "Leaders in Corporate Philanthropy" survey.

In 2016, Melnichenko was given a special award for "good deeds" and charity works.

JSC SUEK received the Grand Prix for "Contribution to the Social Development of Territories" at the 2018 "Leaders of Russian Business" awards, for annually carrying out approximately 150 social and charitable projects in its regions of operation.

Personal life 

In 2005, Melnichenko married Serbian former pop singer and model Aleksandra Nikolić in the South of France. They have two children.

Melnichenko owns two high-tech yachts: Sailing Yacht A (2017) and Motor Yacht A (2008). Both were designed by Philippe Starck.

S/Y A was handed over to him in May 2017 in Monaco. Boat International called it "the boundary pushing superyacht" and "a monument to invention". In 2016, Bloomberg reported that "the swanky boat reflects the same eye for innovation and high-tech detail that Melnichenko, 44, is now focusing on the fertilizer business that’s helped make him one of Russia’s youngest billionaires."

In March 2022, following the EU sanctions imposed on the number of Russian businessmen, the Italian authorities seized his Sailing Yacht A in the port city of Trieste. According to Reuters, Melnichenko responded that he "will be disputing these baseless and unjustified sanctions" which have "no justification" and believes that "the rule of law and common sense will prevail."

Andrey Melnichenko reportedly lives with his family in St Moritz, Switzerland.

See also 
 List of Russian billionaires

References

External links 

Biography at Andrey Melnichenko Foundation (in English)

1972 births
Living people
People from Gomel
Russian people of Belarusian descent
People in the chemical industry
Russian billionaires
Plekhanov Russian University of Economics alumni
Russian individuals subject to European Union sanctions
Russian energy industry businesspeople
Russian activists against the 2022 Russian invasion of Ukraine